The Legislative Assembly of Zabaykalsky Krai is the regional parliament of Zabaykalsky Krai, a federal subject of Russia. A total of 50 deputies are elected for five-year terms.

Elections

2018

References 

Politics of Zabaykalsky Krai
Zabaykalsky Krai